

See also 
 Tennessee's at-large congressional district special election, 1797
 United States House of Representatives elections, 1796 and 1797
 List of United States representatives from Tennessee

References 

1797
Tennessee
United States House of Representatives
Andrew Jackson